Trapiche emerald is a rare variety of the gemstone emerald, characterized by a six-pointed radial pattern of ray-like spokes of dark impurities. It is one of several types of trapiche or trapiche-like minerals, which also include trapiche ruby, sapphire, garnet, chiastolite and tourmaline. The name comes from the Spanish term trapiche, a sugar mill, because of the resemblance of the pattern to the spokes of a grinding wheel.

Trapiche emeralds were first described by Émile Bertrand in 1879. They are generally only (and rarely) found in the western part of the Eastern Cordillera basin, in the Muzo, Coscuez and Peñas Blancas mines of Colombia (but likely not in Chivor as reported in older literature). Singular finds in Brazil and Madagascar have also been reported.

The radial pattern exhibits considerable variance, and often includes a hexagonal structure at the core. There is not yet consensus about the mechanism by which the pattern forms, or the conditions required for it. Various models have been proposed. According to one interpretation the black impurities are remains of the shale matrix in which the emeralds formed, trapped between the radial dendrites of the growing emerald. The trapiche pattern is not an asterism, an optically similar pattern that forms in a different process.

See also 
 Trapiche (disambiguation)

References

Beryl group